XHU-FM is a radio station on 98.1 FM in Veracruz, Veracruz, Mexico. It is owned by Grupo Pazos Radio and is known as XEU with a news/talk format.

History
XEU-AM signed on the air in December 1930. The station received its concession on December 1, 1932, the first day concessions were issued for broadcast stations. It broadcast on 1010 kilohertz and was owned by Fernando Pazos y Compañía. By the late 1960s, after Pazos's death in 1967, the station had moved to 930 kHz. Ultimately, the concession was transferred to a new corporation owned by the Pazos family, which had expanded by acquiring XELL and XEHV in 1964.

In November 2010, XEU received approval to move to FM on 98.1 MHz. While its callsign is XHU-FM, an alteration made in all AM-FM migrations, it continues to brand as XEU.

References

Radio stations in Veracruz